Progress M-7 was a Soviet uncrewed cargo spacecraft which was launched in 1991 to resupply the Mir space station. The twenty-fifth of sixty four Progress spacecraft to visit Mir, it used the Progress-M 11F615A55 configuration, and had the serial number 208. It carried supplies including food, water and oxygen for the EO-8 crew aboard Mir, as well as equipment for conducting scientific research, and fuel for adjusting the station's orbit and performing manoeuvres. It also carried the second VBK-Raduga capsule, intended to return equipment and experiment results to Earth.

Progress M-7 was launched at 13:05:15 GMT on 19 March 1991, atop a Soyuz-U2 carrier rocket flying from Site 1/5 at the Baikonur Cosmodrome. It took three attempts to dock with Mir; the first of which occurred at 14:28 GMT on 21 March, and resulted in Progress M-7 approaching to within  of Mir, before the attempt was aborted. The first two attempts had used the aft docking port of the Kvant-1 module; however, it was decided to use the forward port of the core module for the next one. At 10:12:00 GMT on 26 March, the Soyuz TM-11 spacecraft which had been occupying this port undocked from it, before flying around the station and docking with Kvant-1 at 10:58:59. Progress M-7 successfully docked with Mir at 12:02:28 GMT on 28 March.

Progress M-7 undocked from Mir at 22:59:36 GMT on 6 May, and was deorbited at 16:24:00 the next day, to a destructive reentry over the Pacific Ocean. Its Raduga capsule, which had been deployed following the deorbit burn, came down in the Russian Soviet Federative Socialist Republic at around 17:20 GMT; however, efforts to recover it were unsuccessful.

See also

1991 in spaceflight
List of Progress flights
List of uncrewed spaceflights to Mir

References

Spacecraft launched in 1991
1991 in the Soviet Union
Progress (spacecraft) missions